Mariia Viktorivna Ulitina (also transliterated as Mariya or Marija, born 5 November 1991) is a badminton player from Ukraine and the National Champion of Ukraine. She represented Ukraine in the 2016 Summer Olympics and proceeded to the knockout round after defeating the former world number one Saina Nehwal of India and Lohaynny Vicente of Brazil in the group stage.

Achievements

BWF International Challenge/Series (5 titles, 11 runners-up) 
Women's singles

Women's doubles

  BWF International Challenge tournament
  BWF International Series tournament
  BWF Future Series tournament

See also 
 Ukrainian National Badminton Championships

References

External links 
 
 
 

1991 births
Living people
Sportspeople from Dnipro
Ukrainian female badminton players
Badminton players at the 2016 Summer Olympics
Olympic badminton players of Ukraine
Badminton players at the 2015 European Games
Badminton players at the 2019 European Games
European Games competitors for Ukraine
Badminton players at the 2020 Summer Olympics